Lindauella is a genus of fungi in the order Phyllachorales. This is a monotypic genus, containing the single species Lindauella pyrenocarpoidea.

The genus name of Lindauella is in honour of Gustav Lindau (1866-1923), who was a German mycologist and botanist.

The genus was circumscribed by Heinrich Simon Ludwig Friedrich Felix Rehm in Hedwigia vol.39 on page 82 in 1900.

References

External links
Index Fungorum

Phyllachorales
Monotypic Sordariomycetes genera
Taxa named by Heinrich Rehm
Taxa described in 1900